The 2023 season will be the Kansas City Chiefs' upcoming 54th season in the National Football League, their 64th overall and their eleventh under head coach Andy Reid. The Chiefs, who will enter the season as defending champions, will look to be the first team to repeat as Super Bowl champions since the New England Patriots in 2003 and 2004.

Offseason
All transactions in this section occurred between the end of the 2022 season (excluding futures contracts which began to be signed following the conclusion of the regular season) and the Chiefs first preseason game.

Coaching staff changes

Left team
Coaches listed below left the team for another job.

Job title changes
Coaches listed below stayed with the Chiefs, but received a new job title.

Retirements

Players lost
Below are players who were on the roster at the end of the 2022 season, but were either released or did not re-sign after their contract expired.

Futures contracts
Players signed to futures contracts typically most, if not all, if the 2022 season on the Chiefs or another team's practice squad. These contracts are signed after the conclusion of the regular season through the beginning the next league year. Players with an asterisk finished the 2022 season on the Chiefs practice squad.

Players added
Players below played for another team in 2022 and signed with the Chiefs.

Draft
The Chiefs have 12 draft selections as of the compensatory selections being announced. The Chiefs received two compensatory selections and one 2020 Resolution JC-2A selection. They also traded two draft selections and have received two other draft draft selections in trades. As the defending Super Bowl Champion, their original selections were the final selection of the 1st and 2nd rounds and the final selection before the compensatory selections begin in rounds 3 through 7. Draft selections are subject to change for additional trades, including draft day trades.

Draft trades

Staff

Current roster

Preseason
The Chiefs' preseason opponents and schedule will be announced in the spring. They will play 3 games with 1 guaranteed home and 1 guaranteed away game. As has been the case since the preseason was reduced to 3 games, all 3 games will likely be against three of the 11 NFC opponents they do not already games scheduled against.

Regular season

2023 opponents
Listed below are the Chiefs' opponents for 2023. Exact dates and times will be announced in the spring. One of the Chiefs' home games will be in Germany at either Allianz Arena in Munich or the Deutsche Bank Park in Frankfurt as part of the NFL International Series. The opponent, city, and date will be announced in the spring. As the defending champions, the Chiefs will host the NFL Kickoff Game.

References

External links
 

Kansas City
Kansas City Chiefs seasons
Kansas City Chiefs